The 1938 South Dakota gubernatorial election was held on November 8, 1938. Incumbent Republican Governor Leslie Jensen declined to seek re-election and instead unsuccessfully ran for the U.S. Senate. Harlan J. Bushfield, the former Chairman of the South Dakota Republican Party, won the Republican primary to succeed Jensen. In the general election, he faced Democratic nominee Oscar Fosheim, a State Representative from Miner County, in the general election. Bushfield defeated Fosheim by a relatively close margin, winning his first term as governor.

Democratic Primary

Candidates
 Oscar Fosheim, State Representative from Miner County
 Mancel W. Peterson, State Senator from Day County, former State Senate President

Results

Republican Primary

Candidates
 Harlan J. Bushfield, former Chairman of the South Dakota Republican Party, former Hand County State's Attorney
 Blaine Simons, State Senator from Minnehaha County

Results

General election

Results

References

South Dakota
1938
Gubernatorial
November 1938 events